Botevo is a village in Aksakovo Municipality, in Varna Province, Bulgaria.

The Botev Dam 
The Botev Dam is one of Botevo's most important features. Botev dam was built in 1956 on an area of 250 acres. It is located in the Karamanliyte on the Suha reka river.

By 2011, the dam did not function as a hydropower facility because of the lack of responsible management. The dam is now in an emergency condition. 
In 2012, the preparation of a complete technical documentation for the repair of water intake and gate wells and construction of CIS (control and measurement system) began. MIT - TTX Ltd. began the overhaul of hydraulic structures, and the dam and reservoir was completely rebuilt and restocked. The following species of fish - carp, grass carp, silver carp, rudd and taranka were repopulated in the reservoir. The construction of gazebos, barbecues, bridges and other facilities for lovers of sport fishing will soon begin.

References

Villages in Varna Province